Pertoltice is a municipality in Liberec District in the Liberec Region of the Czech Republic. It has about 300 inhabitants.

Administrative parts
The municipality is made up of villages of Dolní Pertoltice and Horní Pertoltice.

Notable people
William F. Lukes (1847–1923), United States Navy sailor

References

External links

Villages in Liberec District